Diego Pérez may refer to:

Diego Pérez (footballer) (born 1980), Uruguayan footballer
Diego Pérez (tennis) (born 1962), Uruguayan retired professional tennis player